Mini Album Thingy Wingy is an EP by American band The Brian Jonestown Massacre. It was released November 2015 under A Recordings. 

The music video for ''Pish'' was directed by British film-maker Browzan - and subsequently released on MTV Germany.

Track listing

References

2015 albums
The Brian Jonestown Massacre albums